Allan Ince is a Barbadian Olympic hurdler. He represented his country in the men's 400 metres hurdles at the 1988 Summer Olympics. His time was a 52.76 in the hurdles. He also competed in the Men's 4 × 400 metres relay, where his team finished with a time of 3:06.03 in the qualifiers, and a 3:06.93 in the semifinals.

References

1967 births
Living people
Barbadian male hurdlers
Olympic athletes of Barbados
Athletes (track and field) at the 1988 Summer Olympics